In Chinese philosophy, qing is a concept translated variously as "emotion", "feeling", "sentiment", or "passion".

In Confucianism 
In Confucian thought, qing is interpreted as the behavioural quality of a person given their context, which may be bettered through the cultivation of ren (humaneness), li (ritual propriety), and yi (righteousness) to build de, or virtuous moral character. Confucian scholars, such as Han Yu, traditionally identified seven basic emotions, named in the  Book of Rites as happiness, anger, grief, fear, love, hate, and desire.

Neo-Confucians understand qing as products of environmental circumstances affecting xing, or innate human nature. This interpretation of qing as an emotional concept, especially as connected to xing, arose after the Warring States period.

In Daoism 
Daoist teaching aims to free a person from the passions (qing), as articulated by Zhuang Zhou: “[The sage] has the shape of a man, but without qing”. (Zhuangzi ch.5)

See also 
 Ganqing
 Xin

References

Bibliography 

 
 
 
 
 

Concepts in Chinese philosophy
Emotion
Philosophy of mind
Neo-Confucianism
Taoist philosophy